Palm Coast is a city in Flagler County, Florida. As of the 2010 United States Census, the population was 75,180, more than twice the 32,832 counted in 2000. The population was estimated to be 89,800 in 2019. It is the most populous city in Flagler County. Palm Coast is part of the Deltona–Daytona Beach–Ormond Beach, FL metropolitan statistical area.

History

In the late 1950s, most of the land that would become Palm Coast consisted of swamp and pine forest, with only a few farms and beach houses as well as a turpentine distillery. Business activity was concentrated along Florida State Road 100. Tourists paid fees to hunt and fish in the area.

Paved streets and central water and sewer served all lots developed within the plan. On October 29, 1970, ITT built Palm Coast's welcome center. This date is now celebrated as Founder's Day.

In 1975, the Flagler County Board of County Commissioners established Palm Coast Service District, which included almost . Funds for the district were derived primarily from ad valorem taxes and were used to provide fire services, fire hydrants, street lighting, animal control and emergency services.

Florida had its first serious "wildland urban interface" fire in 1985 with the Palm Coast Fire, which burned 131 homes. Research on this fire indicated that the most important factor was the proximity of heavy ground vegetation to the structures. Thirteen years later, fires struck the same Palm Coast subdivision. The 1998 fires were national news because the whole county was ordered to evacuate, and 45,000 people were displaced. Fire suppression organizations responded from 44 states, and Florida hosted the largest aerial suppression operation ever conducted in the United States. Because of the massive effort, only 71 homes were destroyed.

In September 1999, the citizenry of Palm Coast voted by a margin of two to one to incorporate as a council/manager form of government. On December 31, 1999, the City of Palm Coast was officially incorporated. On October 1, 2000, all services were officially transferred from the former Service District to the city of Palm Coast. The five-member City Council is elected at large and serves staggered four-year terms. One member is elected as mayor. The promulgation and adoption of policy are the responsibility of the council and the execution of such policy is the responsibility of the council-appointed city manager. The city hired its first city manager on April 17, 2000.

The city provides a wide range of services including development services, fire services, street construction and maintenance, parks and recreational activities. Palm Coast contracts with the Flagler County Sheriff's Office for law enforcement services. , the city has plans under way for a new city hall, a town center, new fire stations, and additional lands for parks. Preservation and protection of environmentally sensitive lands is a key goal of this city as it prepares for the future.

Geography

The city extends north to the Flagler County line, southwest to the Bunnell city limits, and southeast to touch the city of Flagler Beach.

Interstate 95 crosses Palm Coast from north to south, with access from Exit 293 (Matanzas Woods Parkway), Exit 289 (Palm Coast Parkway), and Exit 284 (Florida State Road 100). U.S. Route 1 runs parallel to I-95 through the western side of Palm Coast, leading into Bunnell.

The area around Palm Coast last saw a direct hit from a tropical cyclone in 2004 when Hurricane Charley passed directly over the area. Since 1851 when hurricane tracking data began, 33 hurricanes and tropical storms have directly affected the area.

Palm Coast has become a bedroom community for St. Augustine,  to the north, and Daytona Beach,  to the south, while some residents also work in Orlando and Jacksonville.

Climate

Economy

, industrial parks within the town house more than 30 mid-size businesses, with the largest one, the "Palm Coast Data" company, employing close to 1,000 people. Flagler County has had one of the highest rates of population growth in the United States since 1990, according to the U.S. Bureau of the Census. However, the area was hit extremely hard by the housing bust's recession. In December 2009, it had the worst unemployment rate of the state of Florida's largest metropolitan areas, according to the Bureau of Labor Statistics. The unemployment rate at that time was 16.9 percent.

Demographics

, there were 35,058 households, out of which 15.0% were vacant. As of 2000, 22.4% had children under the age of 18 living with them, 66.6% were married couples living together, 8.1% had a female householder with no husband present, and 22.7% were non-families. 18.6% of all households were made up of individuals, and 11.9% had someone living alone who was 65 years of age or older. The average household size was 2.38 and the average family size was 2.68.

In 2000, the city's population was spread out, with 18.5% under the age of 18, 4.6% from 18 to 24, 19.7% from 25 to 44, 26.9% from 45 to 64, and 30.2% who were 65 years of age or older. The median age was 51 years. For every 100 females, there were 90.4 males. For every 100 females age 18 and over, there were 87.6 males.

In 2000, the median income for a household in the city was $41,570, and the median income for a family was $45,818. Males had a median income of $31,976 versus $24,637 for females. The per capita income for the city was $21,490. About 5.6% of families and 7.5% of the population were below the poverty line, including 14.3% of those under age 18 and 3.6% of those age 65 or over.

Languages

As of 2000, English spoken as a first language accounted for 87.66% of all residents, while 12.33% spoke other languages as their mother tongue. The most significant was Spanish speakers who made up 6.48% of the population, while German came up as the third most spoken language, which made up 1.18%, Italian was spoken by 1.02%, and Portuguese at 1.00% of the population.

Noted issues

Pedestrian injuries 

On March 2, 2017, Michelle Taylor, a 16-year-old student of Matanzas High School was struck and killed by a car while walking home from school in an area with no sidewalks and few street lights. In the following months, the people of the city petitioned to have more street lights and sidewalks installed throughout the entire city to reduce the number of pedestrian injuries and deaths. Students of Matanzas High School took charge of these efforts by creating committees and petitions to generate attention and pressure the local city council. Towards the end of 2016, Kevin Smith Jr, also a student of Matanzas, was injured in a hit and run under the same conditions.

Notable people

 Ray Black Jr., driver in the NASCAR Xfinity Series
 Blackbear, singer of Hot Girl Bummer
 Caesar DePaço, Portuguese businessman and diplomat serving as Portuguese Consul to Florida
 Ron DeSantis, former U.S. Congressman and current Governor of Florida
 Louis Miceli Jr., vocalist of band Palisades
 Eddie Money, singer of Two Tickets to Paradise
 Reilly Opelka, tennis player
 Leslie West, former lead singer of Mountain
 Home Is Where, emo band

References

External links
 
 City of Palm Coast official website
 Flagler County Chamber of Commerce

 
Populated places on the Intracoastal Waterway in Florida
Cities in Flagler County, Florida
Planned cities in the United States
Populated places established in 1969
Cities in Florida
Former census-designated places in Florida
Planned communities in Florida
1969 establishments in Florida